also known as Obu Masakage was a Japanese samurai warrior of the Sengoku period.  He is known as one of the "Twenty-Four Generals of Takeda Shingen". He was famous for his red armour and skill in battlefield, and was a personal friend of Takeda Shingen. He was the younger brother of Obu Toramasa who was also a retainer of Shingen leading the famous "red fire unit" (derived from Shingen's slogan Fūrinkazan).

After his brother Obu Masatora committed Seppuku as a cover for Takeda Yoshinobu's failed rebellion, Masakage changed his family name to Yamagata(He used the name Obu Masakage at first.).

Masakage was a fierce warrior who fought in many battles and was given a fief in Shinano. He was present at the Battle of Mimasetoge in 1569 and captured Yoshida Castle, a Tokugawa possession, during the Mikatagahara Campaign (1572–73).

He was present for the following Battle of Mikatagahara.  His last campaign was in the ill-fated Battle of Nagashino in 1575, in which he tried to persuade Katsuyori to honorably withdraw.

Ii Naomasa from the Tokugawa clan gained surviving retainers of the Takeda clan and followed the example of "Masakage's red-colored army".

In popular culture 
Yamagata is one of the main characters in Akira Kurosawa's epic film Kagemusha.

References

External links 
  "Legendary Takeda's 24 Generals" at Yamanashi-kankou.jp
Samurai-archives
The armor of red's preparation

Further reading

1524 births
1575 deaths
Samurai
Japanese warriors killed in battle
Takeda retainers